Bolivia participated at the 11th Pan American Games, held in Havana, Cuba from August 2 to August 18, 1991. Fighter William Arancibia won a silver medal at the Taekwondo competition, making it the first ever Bolivian medal at the competition.

See also
 Bolivia at the 1992 Summer Olympics

Nations at the 1991 Pan American Games
P
1991